Atabek Azisbekov (born 6 November 1995) is a Kyrgyz Greco-Roman wrestler. He is two time Asian Championships silver medalist

He represented Kyrgyzstan at the 2020 Summer Olympics in the men's Greco-Roman 87 kg weight class.

He competed in the 87kg event at the 2022 World Wrestling Championships held in Belgrade, Serbia.

Major results

References

External links
 
 
 

1995 births
Living people
Kyrgyzstani male sport wrestlers
Asian Wrestling Championships medalists
Olympic wrestlers of Kyrgyzstan
Wrestlers at the 2020 Summer Olympics
Competitors at the 2013 Summer Universiade
20th-century Kyrgyzstani people
21st-century Kyrgyzstani people